Peta Louise Edebone  (born 9 February 1969 in Melbourne, Victoria) is a softball player from Australia, who won a bronze medal at the 1996 Summer Olympics and 2000 Summer Olympics and a silver medal at the 2004 Summer Olympics. She was captain of the 2004 squad.

After having knee surgery after Athens, she retired from competitive softball. In Sydney, she hit 4 home runs, which tied the current record. The record was broken at the 2004 Summer Olympics by Crystl Bustos.

Edebone is to participate in the annual Victorian Women's Football League Metro vs Country match as a curtain-raiser to Collingwood Football Club vs Carlton Football Club in Round 7 at the Melbourne Cricket Ground on 12 May 2007.

References

1969 births
Living people
Australian Institute of Sport softball players
Australian softball players
Olympic softball players of Australia
Softball players at the 1996 Summer Olympics
Softball players at the 2000 Summer Olympics
Softball players at the 2004 Summer Olympics
Olympic silver medalists for Australia
Olympic bronze medalists for Australia
Sportswomen from Victoria (Australia)
Olympic medalists in softball
Recipients of the Medal of the Order of Australia
Sportspeople from Melbourne
Medalists at the 2004 Summer Olympics
Medalists at the 2000 Summer Olympics
Medalists at the 1996 Summer Olympics
Women's Australian rules footballers